Marcos Von Sperling is a Brazilian professor in Environmental Engineering at Federal University of Minas Gerais. He is known for writing some of the most influential textbooks for wastewater treatment in Brazil and other warm climate regions, known as "Biological wastewater treatment series". These books was later released under the Creative Commons license at IWA Water Wiki.

Education 
Von Sperling graduated from Federal University of Minas Gerais with a Civil Engineering degree in 1979. He received a master's degree in Sanitary Engineering from Federal University of Minas Gerais in 1983. He completed his PhD studies in Environmental Engineering at Imperial College London in 1990.

Bibliography 
 Volume 1: Wastewater Characteristics, Treatment and Disposal (2007)
 Volume 2: Basic Principles of Wastewater Treatment (2007)
 Volume 3: Waste Stabilisation Ponds (2007)
 Volume 4: Anaerobic Reactors (2007)
 Volume 5: Activated Sludge and Aerobic Biofilm Reactors (2007)
 Volume 6: Sludge Treatment and Disposal (2007)

References

External links 
 Google Scholar Author site for Marcos Von Sperling
 Marcos Von Sperling CV at CNPq Lattes Brasil

Living people
Brazilian people of German descent
Academic staff of the Federal University of Minas Gerais
Environmental engineers
Alumni of Imperial College London
Year of birth missing (living people)